MOR Entertainment is a national brand of new media radio station owned and operated by media conglomerate ABS-CBN Corporation.

MOR started in 2001 as the FM brand of ABS-CBN Regional and terrestrially operated 15 radio stations in the Philippines. As a broadcast radio network, MOR stations primarily played contemporary middle-of-the-road and original Pinoy music, as well as radio drama and talk content (news content via TV Patrol Regional was also available on selected stations).

Since the forced shutdown of ABS-CBN brought about by the congressional denial of its franchise, MOR resurfaced as an online radio station starting September 14, 2020. MOR currently broadcasts content via its main and regional pages on Facebook; a dedicated channel on Kumu (MOR TV); and linear feeds on iWantTFC, ABS-CBN Radio Service, and Alto.

History and background

Radio Romance (1989–1993)
At 6:00am on July 16, 1989, ABS-CBN's Manila FM station, DWRR 101.9 MHz, changed format to an easy-listening station known as 101.9 Radio Romance. It played easy-listening love songs except for a Sunday OPM program. At first all of the DJs were female, including Amy Perez. Radio Romance became the first FM station to implement the technological innovation of playlists originating from compact discs.

On August 1, 1989, signaled the station's first nationwide reach when DZRR 103.1 MHz in Baguio became the relay outlet of DWRR 101.9 in Manila, ensuring uninterrupted listening for travelers from Manila to as far north as Ilocos Sur. It was followed by DYLS 97.1 MHz Cebu in Cebu on January 20, 1992, and DXRR 101.1 MHz Davao in Davao on January 25, 1992, which was also the relay outlet of DWRR. In the early 1990s, it began simulcasting via satellite across the country and became known as Radio Romance: Nationwide.

Star Radio (1993–1997)
On July 14, 1993, DXEC 91.9 MHz Cagayan de Oro commenced broadcast as The Great EC 91.9 STAR Radio, with its studios then-located at nearby Limketkai Center. This was the first ABS-CBN regional station to use the "Star Radio" banner, and it was also the first to air in a mass-based format.

In 1995, ABS-CBN started launching its new stations across the country and branded them as ABS-CBN STAR Radio with its tagline The Heart of the City. Those newly launched stations were DWEL 95.5 MHz Laoag, DWEC 94.3 MHz Dagupan (known as ABS-CBN STAR Radio Northern Luzon with DZRR 103.1 MHz Baguio as its relay outlet), DWRD 93.9 MHz Legazpi, DWAC 93.5 MHz Naga, DYMC 91.1 MHz Iloilo, DYOO 101.5 MHz Bacolod, DYTC 94.3 MHz Tacloban, DXRR 101.1 MHz Davao (from a relay satellite station under Radio Romance branding), DXBC 92.7 MHz General Santos and DXFH 98.7 MHz Zamboanga. It became the first branding of ABS-CBN's regional FM network until 1997.

ABS-CBN Radio/ProStar (1997–1999)
On March 1, 1997, under the formation of Regional Network Group (RNG), all ABS-CBN's FM stations were rebranded to ABS-CBN Radio which served to help avoid brand confusion with the rival Star FM, owned by Bombo Radyo. The slogan "The Heart of the City" of "ABS-CBN STAR Radio" was still used. ProStar was a branding of selected ABS-CBN regional FM stations outside Manila.

ABS-CBN For Life! (1999–2001)
On February 8, 1999, ABS-CBN dropped the word Radio and added the slogan For Life!.

My Only Radio/MOR Philippines (2001–2021)
On July 14, 2001, ABS-CBN For Life! was changed to MOR that was first launched in Cagayan de Oro. The network's brand name was coined by Malvern Esparcia (Bernie Bitokbitok), which, aside from its meaning as My Only Radio, is meant to be a shorter designation to the province of Misamis Oriental, where Cagayan de Oro is based. It saw a rebrand of ABS-CBN's provincial FM stations, particularly in some long-time ones which were formerly branded as the ProStar network and ABS-CBN Radio prior to the relaunch. Numerous format changes occurred among its stations with similar program titles applied across provincial areas on July 15, 2001. MOR wasn't launched in Manila since its inception until it made a major change in mid-2013, when the company finally relaunched long-time independent station DWRR-FM (101.9 MHz) as the network's flagship station and effectively made MOR a truly national brand.

On January 17, 2011, ABS-CBN launched 1 new station in Palawan, the newly launched was MOR 99.9 MHz Puerto Princesa after 30 years of being DYPR. MOR 99.9 MHz Puerto Princesa had also its shared station at Sofronio Española, the station was MOR 99.7 MHz Española (now Radyo Bandera since 2021) that was launched on 2011 and ceased operations on 2017.

In a press conference held at the ABS-CBN Compound on June 1, 2018, coinciding the Manila station's ratings leadership and its announcement of this year's Pinoy Music Awards set on July 21, the Manila Radio and Regional divisions agreed to relaunch MOR as MOR Philippines. Under its relaunched brand, the network will connect Manila and its provincial stations with unified program brands and strong music choices; thus, the new tagline "One Vibe, One Sound." The MOR Philippines relaunch will be by phases which began on August 11.

On June 1, 2019, MOR stations in Manila, Cebu, and Baguio expanded its video streaming platform as exclusive channels to cable TV subscription service Sky Cable in their respective cities.

Network programming
Despite its unified branding, programming among stations remained to be handled separately between Manila and Regional stations. The network's Manila station is jointly managed by ABS-CBN's Manila Radio division, along with AM flagship station DZMM Radyo Patrol 630, and the Star Creatives group; MOR Regional's programming, meanwhile, is supplied under management of the company's Regional Network Group division.

MOR Philippines began its presence on August 11, 2018, with the launching of MOR Regional's weekend programs Dyis is It and MOR Presents, which began its Manila debut on the next day. Other adjustments are underway to unify MOR's branding across all its stations with plans to create more national programs for the network.

MOR Philippines also aired Pantawid ng Pag-ibig: At Home Together Concert on March 22, 2020. The concert was aimed to help the people who were in need because of the Enhanced Community Quarantine.

Over-the-air shutdown of ABS-CBN assets
On May 5, 2020, due to the cease and desist order issued by the National Telecommunications Commission, all MOR stations have suspended their broadcasting activities, together with all ABS-CBN, S+A, and Radyo Patrol stations across the country after its legislative franchise expired.

On July 15, 2020, ABS-CBN announced the painful pronouncement to its employees that the company would go into retrenchment on August 31, laying-off many of its employees after its new franchise was denied by the House of Representatives on July 10, 2020. The following day in an episode of Failon Ngayon sa TeleRadyo, DJ Chacha, anchor of Dear MOR and formerly Heartbeats confirmed that MOR Philippines would fold on the said retrenchment date.

Instead of August 31, MOR Philippines signed-off on the evening of August 28, 2020, on the same day as ABS-CBN Regional's 12 local TV Patrol and 10 local morning shows.

Shift to online programming
On September 14, 2020, selected DJs of MOR Philippines, including those from Manila, were rehired by ABS-CBN to main the new phase of MOR as a digital broadcast entity, mirroring its network's flagship ABS-CBN (Kapamilya Channel) and TeleRadyo digital pivot and focusing on consolidated programming content over playing music like before as a terrestrial station (partly due to Facebook's restrictions on playing music, the new MOR focuses on playing Star Music songs). Select programs resurfaced under the new setup, but with multiple hosts depending on the region where the rehired jocks are from. Consequently, hosts from Visayas and Mindanao are required to use Tagalog as their lingua franca for their respective MORe sa Umaga and several Dear MOR daily broadcasts.

Also, as part of this consolidation, programs formerly exclusive from MOR Manila (except for the flagship Dear MOR, which was renamed Dear MOR Presents: Dear Popoy and is now broadcast across all MOR Facebook pages and MOR TV on Kumu) are adopted by the regional MOR pages as well, such as Onsehan Na! (formerly Ready Get MORe: Level Up!) and SLR: Sex, Love and Relationships.

MOR Entertainment (2021–present)
On February 14, 2021, ABS-CBN relaunched the service as MOR Entertainment with its programming on Facebook, Kumu, Spotify, YouTube and iWantTFC. It also streams live on iWantTFC, ABS-CBN Radio Service, Alto, and the MOR website.

Final MOR Stations
Before its forced shutdown on free-to-air FM radio, MOR broadcast through the following stations:

Note:

1. Relay from MOR 103.1 Baguio.
2. Inactive from 2017 to 2021 due to location.
3. Now Radyo Bandera since 2021.
4. Now FMR Baguio since 2021.

Theme music

The first theme music was recorded in English by Anna Fegi in 2001. In 2007, in line with its 6th anniversary, a new jingle was launched with a pop-rock arrangement entitled "Ang Gusto Ko, MOR" performed by Emman Abatayo of Pinoy Dream Academy. The original jingle was revived in late 2007 and performed by various artists including Erik Santos and Aiza Seguerra.

On July 7, 2013, together with the rebranding of MOR as a national brand, the theme was given a refresh and its music video was launched on ASAP 18, also performed by various artists. The original version of the refreshed jingle was recorded in both Filipino and English by Toni Gonzaga-Soriano, Vice Ganda, and Daniel Padilla, and was adopted by all MOR stations. Portions of the jingle contain elements from DWRR-FM's first For Life jingle for its first verse with altered lyrics (representing the iconic status of the once-independent Manila station) and the pre-2013 MOR jingle. The jingle was used until August 7, 2016, in favor of a romance-themed version recorded by Now United member Bailey May and Ylona Garcia. The 2nd version was used extensively on the Manila station from the day after, while provincial stations only adopted it on an occasional basis, as the ABS-CBN Regional group received its own set of jingles produced by Dennis Ba-ang (popularly known on-air as David Bang from MOR Cagayan de Oro). The management, however, reverted its primary jingle to the original 2013 version by June 4, 2017; with the newer rendition being used only as an alternate until it was retired weeks later.

On July 21, 2018, with the upcoming relaunch as MOR Philippines, a new network jingle was introduced during its Pinoy Music Awards, combining the 2013 jingle with David Bang's MOR regional stingers. Its new jingle was launched at noon of September 24, 2018. Toni, Vice, and Daniel were reintroduced to sing the revamped jingle. Two sub-versions were recorded in the 2018 refresh. One version omits the "For Life" phrase used by the Manila station to allow usage for MOR Regional stations where its respective cities provide a distinct local slogan among stations.

See also
 ABS-CBN
 List of ABS-CBN Corporation channels and stations
 List of radio stations in the Philippines

References

Notes

External links
 

 
Philippine radio networks
Assets owned by ABS-CBN Corporation
1989 establishments in the Philippines
2020 disestablishments in the Philippines
Internet radio stations in the Philippines
Radio stations established in 1989
Radio stations disestablished in 2020